The fancy rat (Rattus norvegicus domestica) is the domesticated form of Rattus norvegicus, the brown rat, and the most common species of rat kept as a pet. The name fancy rat derives from the use of the adjective fancy for a hobby, also seen in "animal fancy", a hobby involving the appreciation, promotion, or breeding of pet or domestic animals.  The offspring of wild-caught specimens, having become docile after having been bred for many generations, fall under the fancy type.

Fancy rats were originally targets for blood sport in 18th- and 19th-century Europe. Later bred as pets, they now come in a wide variety of coat colors and patterns, and are bred and raised by several rat enthusiast groups around the world. They are sold in pet stores and by breeders. Fancy rats are generally easy to care for, and are quite affordable, even compared to other small pets; this is one of their biggest draws. Additionally, they are quite independent, affectionate, loyal and easily trained. They are considered more intelligent than other domesticated rodents. Healthy fancy rats typically live 2 to 3 years, but are capable of living a year or so longer.

Fancy rats are used widely in medical research, as their physiology is very similar to that of humans. When used in this field, they are referred to as laboratory rats (lab rats).

Domesticated rats are physiologically and psychologically different from their wild relatives, and typically pose no more of a health risk than other common pets. For example, domesticated brown rats are not considered a disease threat, although exposure to wild rat populations could introduce pathogens like the bacteria Streptobacillus moniliformis into the home. Fancy rats have different health risks from their wild counterparts, and thus are unlikely to succumb to the same illnesses as wild rats.

History 

The origin of the modern fancy rat begins with the rat-catchers of the 18th and 19th centuries who trapped rats throughout Europe. These rat-catchers would then either kill the rats, or, more likely, sell the rats to be used in blood sport. Rat-baiting was a popular sport until the beginning of the 20th century. It involved filling a pit with several rats and then placing bets on how long it would take a terrier to kill them all. It is believed that both rat-catchers and sportsmen began to keep certain, odd-colored rats during the height of the sport, eventually breeding them and then selling them as pets. The two men thought to have formed the basis of rat fancy are Jack Black, self-proclaimed rat-catcher to Queen Victoria, and Jimmy Shaw, manager of one of the largest sporting public houses in London. These two men are responsible for beginning many of the color varieties present today. Black, specifically, was known for taming the "prettier" rats of unusual color, decorating them with ribbons, and selling them as pets.

Rat fancy as a formal, organized hobby began when a woman named Mary Douglas asked for permission to bring her pet rats to an exhibition of the National Mouse Club at the Aylesbury Town Show in England on October 24, 1901. Her black-and-white hooded rat won "Best in Show" and ignited interest in the area. After Douglas' death in 1921, rat fancy soon began to fall back out of fashion. The original hobby formally lasted from 1912 to 1929 or 1931, as part of the National Mouse and Rat Club, at which point Rat was dropped from the name, returning it to the original National Mouse Club. The hobby was revived in 1976 with the formation of the English National Fancy Rat Society (NFRS). Pet rats are now commonly available in stores and from breeders, and there exist several rat fancier groups worldwide.

Differences from wild rats 

While domesticated rats are not removed enough from their wild counterparts to justify a distinct subspecies (like the dog versus grey wolf), there are significant differences that set them apart; the most apparent is coloring. Random color mutations may occur in the wild, but these are rare. Most wild R. norvegicus are a dark brown color, while fancy rats may be anything from white to cinnamon to blue.

Behaviorally, domesticated pet rats are tamer than those in the wild. They are more comfortable around humans and known to seek out their owners while roaming freely. They have decreased reactions to light and sound, are less cautious of new food, and have better tolerance to overcrowding. Domesticated rats are shown to mate earlier, more readily, and for a longer period of time over their lifespan. Also, domesticated rats exhibit different behaviors when fighting with each other; while wild rats almost always flee a lost battle, caged rats spend protracted amounts of time in a belly-up or boxing position. These behavioral traits are thought to be products of environment as opposed to genetics. However, it is also theorized that there are certain underlying biological reasons for why some members of a wild species are more receptive to domestication than others, and that these differences are then passed down to offspring (compare domesticated silver fox).

The body structure of domesticated rats differs from that of a wild rat as well. The body of a fancy rat is smaller, with larger ears and a longer tail. Domesticated rats have generally smaller and sharper facial features as well.

Domesticated rats have a longer lifespan than that of wild rats. Because domesticated rats are protected from predators and have ready access to food, water, shelter, and medical care, their average lifespan is around two to three years, in contrast to wild R. norvegicus, which average a lifespan of less than one year. However, wild rats generally have larger brains, hearts, livers, kidneys, and adrenal glands than laboratory rats. The fancy rat and wild rat also each face a multitude of differing health concerns; the former is at risk of developing a pneumococcal infection from exposure to humans, while the latter may harbor tapeworms after coming in contact with carriers such as cockroaches and fleas.

Varieties 

As in other pet species, a variety of colors, coat types, and other features that do not appear in the wild have either been developed, or have appeared spontaneously. Fancy rats in themselves are a subspecies and as such do not have distinctive breeds. Any individual rat may be defined one or more ways by its color, coat, marking, and non-standard body type. This allows for very specific classifications such as a ruby-eyed cinnamon Berkshire rex Dumbo.

Coloring 
While some pet rats retain the agouti coloring of the wild brown rat (three tones on the same hair), others have solid colors (a single color on each hair), a trait derived from rats with black coats. Agouti-based colors include agouti, cinnamon, and fawn. Black-based colors include black, beige, blue, and chocolate.

Eye color is considered a subset of coloring, and coat color definitions often include standards for the eyes, as many genes which control eye color will also affect the coat color or vice versa. The American Fancy Rat and Mouse Association (AFRMA) lists black, pink, ruby, and odd-eyed (two differently colored eyes) as possible eye colors, depending on the variety of rat shown. Ruby refers to eyes which at a glance appear black, but on closer observation are a deep, dark red.

Color names can vary for more vaguely defined varieties, like lilac and fawn, while the interpretations of standards can fluctuate between (and even within) different countries or clubs.

Markings 

Further dividing the varieties of fancy rats are the many different markings. Fancy rats can appear in any combination of colors and markings. The markings are typically in reference to the patterns and ratios of colored hair versus white hair. Two extremes would be a self (completely solid, non-white color) and a Himalayan (completely white except blending into colored areas at the nose and feet, called points, as in a Himalayan cat's markings).

Markings have a strict standard, with detailed terminology, for showing in fancy rat pet shows. However, many domestic rats are not closely bred to any color standard; many of those found in pet shops will have mismarkings from a formal breeding perspective, which are defined as variations in markings that are not recognized as conforming to a breed standard published by a rat fancier organisation.

Commonly recognized standards include:
 Berkshire – colored top, white belly
 hooded – color runs in a saddle, a single, unbroken line from the full head down to the spine and possibly partly down the tail
 capped – color on the full head only
 blazed – colored head (capped) or body (Irish, Berkshire or self) with a triangular wedge of white fur over the face.
 variegated – any form of mismatched oddities in the fur. Can be anything from a broken or spotted hood to a misshaped blaze.
 Irish or English Irish – In England, the Irish is standardized by the NFRS as an equilateral triangle of white with a side that begins at the chest, or between the front legs, and where the point ends mid-length. In the United States and elsewhere, clubs like the AFRMA distinguish this marking as the English Irish and allow for another standardized Irish in which the rat may have white of an even or symmetrical nature anywhere along its underside.

Other marking varieties include spotted or Dalmatian (named for the spotted Dalmatian dog), Essex, masked, Himalayan (typically a gradient of color along the body, darkest at the base of the tail and nose as in Siamese cats), and Down Under or Downunder (an Australian variety that has a solid color stripe on the belly or a color marking there that corresponds to the markings on the top).

Body type 

Two of the most prominent and standardized physical changes applied to rats through selective breeding are the development of the Manx rat and Dumbo rat. The Dumbo rat, whose origins are in the United States, is characterized by having large, low, round ears on the sides of its head caused by a recessive mutation, and was named for its resemblance to the fictional character Dumbo the Flying Elephant. The Manx rat is tailless due to a genetic mutation, and was named for the Manx cat which shares this feature, though not necessarily due to the same mutation. Breeding Manx rats does raise some ethical and health concerns however, as rats use their tails for both balance and thermoregulation.

Coat types 
There is a relatively small variety of coats compared to the number of colors and markings, and not all are internationally standardized. The most common type is the normal or standard, which is allowed variance in coarseness between the sexes; males have a coarse, thick, rough coat, while females' coats are softer and finer. Other standardized coats include: rex, in which all the hairs are curly, even the whiskers; velveteen, a softer variation of the rex; satin or silky coat, which is extra-soft and fine, with a sheen; and Harley, characterized by wispy long straight hairs. Remaining coat types are not defined by the hair itself, but rather by the lack of it, such as hairless rats.

Hairless rats 

Hairless rats are a coat variety characterized by varying levels of hair loss. One type of hairless rat is bred from curly-coated rexes. These range from having areas of very short fur to being completely bald. Since rex is a dominant trait, there only needs to be one rex parent to produce curly rex-coated offspring. However, when two rex parents are bred, two copies of the trait may be present in the offspring. This causes varying levels of hairlessness, and has earned the colloquial name "double rex". The other type of hairless rat is sometimes referred to as a "true hairless". This is caused by a different gene, and is distinguishable from a hairless double rex by the absence of whiskers. Unlike a double rex, this type of hairless rat is incapable of growing hairs on any part of the body. One additional subset of semi-hairless rats, patchwork rex, constantly lose their hair and regrow it in different "patches" several times throughout their life. Hairless rats may be prone to more health problems than their standard- or rex-coated counterparts, including a reduced tolerance for cold, kidney and liver failure, more prone to skin injury, skin conditions, and shortened life span.

Ethics of selective breeding 
There is controversy among rat fanciers in regard to selective breeding. On one hand, breeding rats to "conform" to a specific standard or to develop a new one is a large part of what the fancy was founded on. On the other hand, the process results in many rats who do not "conform", and are then either given away, sold as food, or killed—the latter referred to as culling.

There are concerns as to whether breeding hairless and tailless rats is ethical. The tail is vital for rats' balance and for adjusting body temperature. Tailless rats have greater risk of heat exhaustion, poor bowel and bladder control, falling from heights, and can be at risk for life-threatening deformities in the pelvic region, like hind leg paralysis and megacolon. Similarly, hairless rats are less protected from scratches and the cold without their coat. Groups such as the NFRS prohibit the showing of these varieties at their events and forbid advertisement through affiliated services.

Availability 

Because R. norvegicus and related species are seen as pests, their intentional import into foreign countries is often regulated. For example, the importation of foreign rodents is prohibited in Australia, and so various coat types, colors, and varieties have been bred separately from foreign lines, or are just not obtainable within that country (for example, hairless and Dumbo rats do not exist in Australia). In other areas, like the Canadian province of Alberta, which is considered rat-free, the ownership of domestic fancy rats outside of schools, laboratories, and zoos is illegal.

Health 

Human-raised R. norvegicus are more prone to specific health risks and diseases than their wild counterparts, but they are also far less likely to succumb to certain illnesses that are prevalent in the wild. The major considerations for susceptibility include exposure, living conditions, and diet.

Rats that live their entire lives indoors usually are able to avoid disease-causing bacteria such as Salmonella and Pseudomonas aeruginosa; the latter is absent in treated water. They may also more easily avoid vectors like cockroaches, beetles, and fleas which are essential for the spread of endemic typhus and intestinal parasites like the rat tapeworm. Additionally, pet or laboratory rats enjoy the intrinsic benefits of having a consistent and well-balanced diet, along with access to medical care.

Porphyrin is a browny-red substance that fancy rats can develop around the eyes and nose. It may appear like dried blood, but is a mucus-like substance that is released at times of stress or if the rat has a respiratory infection. It can also be caused by temporary irritation in the eye, such as the rat accidentally scratching its eye while grooming.

Mites also pose a health risk. Mites are microscopic bloodsucking parasites that can irritate the skin of fancy rats, and if they have a preexisting health condition, it can cause them to die from their bodies' inability to handle two problems at once.

While living indoors decreases the risk of contracting certain diseases, living in close quarters with other rats, lack of proper protection from environmental factors (e.g. temperature, humidity), an unhealthy diet, and the stresses inherently associated with living in an unnatural habitat can all adversely affect a rat's health to make them more prone to specific conditions. Specifically, Tyzzer's disease, protozoic infections (e.g. Giardia muris), and pseudotuberculosis are usually seen in stressed or young rats. Additionally, pet rats are exposed to Streptococcus pneumoniae, a zoonotic disease caught from humans, not the same bacteria associated with pneumonia. A human-associated fungus, Pneumocystis carinii (also found in almost all domesticated animals), is usually asymptomatic in the rat, unless the rat's immune system is compromised by illness. If this occurs, the infection can develop into pneumonia.

Several diseases, like Rat Coronavirus Infection (RCI), Sendai virus, and Murine Respiratory Mycoplasmosis (MRM, Mycoplasma pulmonis), are prevalent simply because their highly contagious natures work in tandem with the way rats are kept in laboratories, pet stores, and by breeders. MRM is far less likely to occur in laboratory rats than in those kept as pets.

Pet rats can also develop pituitary tumors if fed high-calorie diets, and ringtail if placed in areas with low humidity or high temperatures. Staphylococcus spp. are a mostly benign group of bacteria that commonly reside on the top of the skin, but cuts and scratches from social and hierarchical fighting can open up the pathways for them to cause ulcerative dermatitis.

There is some evidence that spayed female rats ("does") are less likely to develop mammary and pituitary tumors than intact females. Research into prevention of common diseases and health issues in rats is ongoing. Dietary changes are among the main suggestions for improved health and longevity in fancy rats, including feeding rat-friendly superfoods  in moderation to reduce the risk of cancers, heart disease, and stroke.

Risks to owners 
Keeping rats as pets can come with the stigma that rats supposedly transmit dangerous diseases to their owners. Usually, rats bred as pets are tested and treated for diseases and parasites. One fear is that all rats carry plague, when in fact R. norvegicus is not among the list of species considered a threat. In 2004, an outbreak of salmonella in the United States was connected to people who owned pet rats. However, it has been determined that a pet rat's initial exposure to salmonella, along with many other zoonotic rat diseases, typically indicates exposure to wild rodent populations, either from an infestation in the owner's home, or from the pet's contaminated food, water, or bedding.

Another risk to rat owners is rat-bite fever. This is a rare disease among domesticated rats and is most often found in rats from large chain pet stores that breed their stock of rats in masses (usually with the intention of being snake food rather than pets) or from breeders with neglectful rat husbandry. This disease is fairly unnoticeable in the rat, but is characterized by swelling of the bite or scratch site, fever, vomiting, and body aches. It is contracted by the bite or scratch of an infected rat. As an early breeder of fancy rats, Jack Black recounted that he nearly died several times after bites.

In 2017, the Centers for Disease Control reported an outbreak of Seoul virus spread by pet rats.

Fiction 

In fiction, pet brown rats are often depicted as tamed rather than domesticated, akin to when a character befriends a wolf. As tamed pets, they have been portrayed in roles that vary from evil to ambiguous to lovable.

Samantha Martin, a professional animal trainer for films, commercials, and music videos, has claimed that rats are one of the easiest animals to train due to their adaptability, intelligence, and focus.

In the direct-to-video sequels to the 1987 film The Brave Little Toaster, The Brave Little Toaster to the Rescue and The Brave Little Toaster Goes to Mars, Ratso is the pet rat of Rob McGroarty.

The novella Ratman's Notebooks by Stephen Gilbert was the basis for the films Willard (1971) and Ben (1972), and a 2003 remake of the first film. Here, the protagonist befriends the rats found in his home and builds up a close relationship, only to have it end tragically. While these movies generally emphasize the popular perception of malevolence—they kill people and cats and ransack grocery stores—other wild rats who become pets are portrayed in more neutral to positive ways; the television show, House, briefly featured "Steve McQueen", the pet rat of the titular character.

In certain versions of the Teenage Mutant Ninja Turtles franchise, the master and adoptive father of the turtles is Splinter, who was once the pet rat of ninja Hamato Yoshi and learned his martial arts skills by imitating his owner.

In the 1996 point-and-click adventure game Phantasmagoria: A Puzzle of Flesh, the protagonist Curtis Craig owns a pet rat named Blob, which is seen various times in the game and is even involved in one of the many puzzles that the player must decipher.

Pet rats are unofficially allowed at Hogwarts School of Witchcraft and Wizardry in the Harry Potter series, but are not generally seen as desirable pets. Ronald Weasley has a pet rat, Scabbers.

Christopher Boone, the autistic protagonist of The Curious Incident of the Dog in the Night-Time has a pet rat named Toby.

See also 
 Fancy mouse
 Experimental evolution
 List of fictional mice and rats
 Rat agility
 Rat Genome Database
 Working rat

References

External links 

 Rat Behavior and Biology – A website with referenced articles that pertain to the scientific study of the domesticated Norway rat.
 Rat Guide – An online resource with information about fancy rat health and treatment of illness

Organisations 
 American Fancy Rat and Mouse Association (USA) (AFRMA)
 The National Fancy Rat Society (UK) (NFRS)
 Rat and Mouse Club of America (USA) (RMCA)
 The Midlands Rat Club (UK) (MRC)
 Rat Club (NZ) (RC)
 Associazione Italiana Ratti - Rat Rescue Italia ODV (IT)

Forma taxa
Mammals described in 1769
Rats as pets
Taxa named by John Berkenhout